Drake Rymsha (born August 6, 1998) is an American professional ice hockey forward who is currently playing with the  Bakersfield Condors in the American Hockey League (AHL). He has played for the Los Angeles Kings of the National Hockey League (NHL).

Playing career
Rymsha played for the London Knights, Ottawa 67s and Sarnia Sting of the Ontario Hockey League, and was selected by the Los Angeles Kings in the fifth round, 138th overall, of the 2017 NHL Entry Draft. He was signed by the Kings to an entry-level contract on August 25, 2018.

Rymsha made his NHL debut in the final game of the Los Angeles Kings 2020–21 season, appearing on the fourth-line in a 5-1 defeat to the Colorado Avalanche on May 13, 2021.

Following the completion of his entry-level with the Kings, Rymsha was not tendered a qualifying offer by the organization, releasing him as a free agent. On September 8, 2021, Rymsha signed a one-year contract with his former ECHL club, the Fort Wayne Komets. In the 2021–22 season, Rymsha was the offensive catalyst to start the year with the Komets, before he was signed to a professional try-out with the Hershey Bears on November 11, 2021. He later established a role on the team with the Bears and secured an AHL contract for the remainder of the year on January 23, 2022. He would make 49 regular season appearances with the Bears contributing with 1 goal and 9 points.

As a free agent from the Bears, Rymsha continued his career in the AHL after signing a one-year contract with the Bakersfield Condors, the primary affiliate to the Edmonton Oilers, on August 9, 2022.

Career statistics

References

External links

1998 births
Living people
Bakersfield Condors players
Fort Wayne Komets players
Hershey Bears players
Ice hockey players from Michigan
London Knights players
Los Angeles Kings draft picks
Los Angeles Kings players
Manchester Monarchs (ECHL) players
Ontario Reign (AHL) players
Ottawa 67's players
Sarnia Sting players